Valentina Ivanovna Veres, in Ukrainian: Валентина Іванівна Верес (born 1951) is a Ukrainian textile artist and master weaver, who was appointed an Honoured Artist of Ukraine in 1999. She is the daughter of folk artist Hanna Veres.

Biography
Veres was born in 1951 in the village of Obukhovychi in the Vyshhorod Raion of Kyiv region to folk artist Hanna Veres. She is the grand-daughter of the artist Maria Posobchuk and the daughter of the artist Hanna Veres. Her sister  is also an artist.

From 1988 until its closure in 1992 Veres took an active part in the creation of the Weaving Museum in Obukhovychi. Most of her work is dedicated to creating decorative panels, woven towels, clothes, and fabrics for the interiors of public buildings, while introducing elements of embroidery into her art.

Veres's works have been exhibited at international exhibitions since 1970. Personal exhibitions took place in Kyiv in 1978 and 1994. She also created an edition of decorative towels for the Afghan Museum in Ukraine.

List of selected works 
 Space Melodies (1983, decorative panel)
 My thoughts are my songs (1974-1977, cycles of woven works)
 Red Viburnum (1994) - Kateryna Bilokur Prize winner
 Stage woven folk costumes for the choir of the village of Obukhovichi (1983)

Awards and recognition 
 Member of the National Union of Masters of Folk Art of Ukraine since 1976
 M. Ostrovsky Prize (1979)
 Honoured Artist of Ukraine since 1999

Sources
 Видатні люди Іванківського краю

References 

Living people
20th-century women textile artists
20th-century textile artists
Ukrainian embroiderers
20th-century Ukrainian women artists
People from Kyiv Oblast
1928 births